Yen Wen-chang (born 1947) is a Taiwanese politician.

Yen was elected to the sixth Legislative Yuan as a member of the Democratic Progressive Party representing Kaohsiung County in December 2004. During his legislative tenure, Yen took an interest in the Kuomintang's assets, and the use of ractopamine in pork imported from the United States. Yen lost reelection in 2008, to Kuomintang candidate Chung Shao-ho.

References

1947 births
Living people
Members of the 6th Legislative Yuan
Kaohsiung Members of the Legislative Yuan
Democratic Progressive Party Members of the Legislative Yuan